In the 1996–97 season, Southampton Football Club competed in the FA Premier League.

Season summary
For the fourth time in five seasons, Southampton managed to avoid relegation. Manager Dave Merrington had been dismissed at the end of the previous season to be succeeded by Graeme Souness, who brought in quality new players including Claus Lundekvam, Eyal Berkovic and Egil Østenstad. A 6–3 win over Manchester United in late October, which saw Ostenstad scoring a brace, was the highlight of the season, and Southampton entered the final game of the season only needing a draw to confirm their survival. Survival was achieved, but it did not prevent Souness from quitting the club after just one season, handing over the reins to Stockport's Dave Jones.

Ali Dia incident
After receiving a phone call purporting to be from Liberian international and former FIFA World Player of the Year George Weah, Graeme Souness signed Senegalese "international" striker Ali Dia. "Weah" had told Souness that Dia was his cousin, had played for Paris Saint-Germain and had played 13 times for his country. None of this was true: the phone call was made by a fellow university student of Dia's to Souness, suggesting that he should give Dia a chance with the Saints. Nonetheless, Souness was convinced, and signed Dia on a one-month contract.

Dia played just one game for Southampton, against Leeds United on 23 November 1996; he had originally been scheduled to play in a reserve friendly against Arsenal, but the match was cancelled due to a waterlogged pitch. In the match against Leeds, he came on as a substitute for Matt Le Tissier after 32 minutes but his performance was spectacularly below Premier League quality. He was later substituted for Ken Monkou after playing for 53 minutes; Leeds won the match 2–0.

Le Tissier himself recalled the story in a television interview, telling that Dia spent only a weekend at the club. He first came down to train with the team on Friday morning; according to Le Tissier he "didn't look very good" and the players thought that they would "never see him again", but the next day Dia was surprisingly named on the bench. His performance on the field after he came on to replace Le Tissier "was unbelievable. He ran around the pitch like Bambi on ice, it was very very embarrassing to watch." Yet, according to the team's physiotherapist, on Sunday morning Dia "turned up for treatment of an injury" and "then he left, and we never saw him again . . . nobody knows where he went." Dia was released by Southampton two weeks later.

Final league table

Results summary

Results by round

Results
Southampton's score comes first

Legend

FA Premier League

FA Cup

League Cup

Players

First-team squad
Squad at end of season

Left club during season

Reserve squad

References

Southampton F.C. seasons
Southampton F.C.